Little (Chamber) Symphony No. 3, Op. 71 by Darius Milhaud is a work for chamber orchestra that was composed in 1921. The work is also known by the title Sérénade. This work is not to be confused with Milhaud's Symphony No. 3, which is known as Te Deum.

The work is polytonal, with nearly every instrument playing around a different tonal center, and is also characterized by its fast moving lines, pastoral topoi, and energetic sound.

Sérénade received its premiere in Paris, by the Société de Musique de Chambre. The score was released by Universal that same year.

Milhaud composed this piece in Paris, though he had recently returned from an extended stay in Brazil. His stay in Brazil influenced his music, especially the quickly moving lines in the opening and closing movements, which are reminiscent of the “Brazilian rainforest”.  This Brazilian influence connects this work to the other works by Milhaud such as Saudades do Brasil and the other Little Symphonies.

Instrumentation and ‘Movements’ 

The work is a septet for the following instruments: Flute, Clarinet, Bassoon, Violin, Viola, Violoncello, and String Bass.

The work can be divided into three “movements” as indicated in the score. It runs a total time of about three minutes and 40 seconds.

The first movement, ‘Vivement” begins with the clarinet and bassoon, and then expands to add the strings and flutes after four measures. The use of the clarinet lends a unique quality, and the addition of each new instrument adds increasing dissonance and polytonality to the work. The first ‘movement’ lasts about 75 seconds.

The second movement, ‘Calme”, begins with alternating sixteenth note figures in the flute and clarinet, accompanied by pizzicato ‘cello and bass. This segment is marked by its intense chromaticism. The second ‘movement’ lasts about 85 seconds.

The work ends with ‘Rondemont’, which returns to the frenzied sound of the work's beginning.  The pastoral feeling (aided by the clarinet) returns, having been absent during the ‘Calme”. The work builds increasing tension as it approaches the final cadence, finally ending on a Bb Major 9 chord. This ‘movement’ lasts about 60 seconds.

Recordings 

A sample of recordings of this symphony (usually as part of a collection of all six “Little Symphonies”) includes 

 A 1967 recording by the Orchestra of Radio Luxembourg, conducted by Milhaud himself, released on Candide. Re-released in 2007. 
 A 1995 recording by L’Ensemble de Temps Modernes, conducted by Bernard Dekais, released on Cypres
 A 2014 recording by the Luxembourg Radio Orchestra, conducted by Grant Johannessen, released on Brilliant Classics

External links 
 Radio Orchestra of Luxembourg Recording

References

Symphonies by Darius Milhaud